"Speedy Gonzales" is a 1961 David Dante song (RCA 8056) about Speedy Gonzales, "the fastest mouse in all Mexico". It was written by Buddy Kaye, Ethel Lee and David Hess. The David Dante original briefly entered the US Music Vendor chart in April 1961.

Pat Boone version

The song was popularised in the United States as a 1962 single by Pat Boone. The Boone version peaked at the No. 6 Billboard Hot 100 position in 1962 during a total chart run of 13 weeks, doing better in many national charts in Europe, where it sold a million copies. The female voice ("La-la-la...") on this song was of Robin Ward. It also incorporated Mel Blanc voicing Speedy Gonzales as he did in the Warner Brothers cartoons.

Dante's version details a demand from a girl named Consuela to Speedy to stop roving about and take care of his neglected household. Boone's song adds a spoken introduction stating that he was wandering between some old adobe haciendas on a moonlit night in Mexico, where he heard the voice of a Mexican girl calling to Speedy, and Mel Blanc's inserts replace a recurring line from Dante's lyrics.

Warner Bros. Pictures sued Boone and Dot Records for $850,000 over Blanc's performance of Speedy's voice on Boone's record without their authorization. The case was later dropped.

Charts
Pat Boone version

Kumbia All Starz version

"Speedy Gonzales" by A.B. Quintanilla y Los Kumbia All Starz is the third single from the album Ayer Fue Kumbia Kings, Hoy Es Kumbia All Starz. The song was covered in Spanish.

Personnel
 Written by Buddy Kaye, David Hess, and Ethel Lee
 Produced by A.B. Quintanilla III
 Lead vocals by Pee Wee
 Background vocals by Roque Morales and Memo Morales
 Intro by A.B. Quintanilla III

Other versions

English-language versions
 In 1965, Soupy Sales recorded the song on his album "Soupy Sales Sez Do The Mouse"
 Recorded in English, but with a Cantonese spoken section: "墨西哥女郎" ("Mexican Girl") by The Fabulous Echoes featuring Tang Kei Chan (鄧寄塵) (Hong Kong, 1965)
 In 1969, the song was recorded by the Hep Stars and became their last single
 In 1973, the song was recorded by the Navajo Sundowners on their album "Navajo Sundowners, Volume 3, and re-released in 1974 on Volume 8.
 Covered by The Wurzels on their 1975 album The Wurzels Are Scrumptious and later featured as a B-Side to their single Give Me England in 1977. 
 In 1977, Charo and the Salsoul Orchestra made a cover on the album Cuchi Cuchi
 In 1980, Lena Zavaroni covered the song on her album Songs Are Such Good Things
 In 2002, the Belgian band Swoop had a hit with a cover version.
 In 2014, the Ubisoft-based band Los Pimientos Locos covered this song for the game Just Dance 2015.

Other-language versions 
 In Spanish: Manolo Muñoz, The Sacados
 In Spanish: Klasse (Venezuelan band) (1987)
 In German ("Kleiner Gonzales"): Rex Gildo, Caterina Valente with her brother Silvio Francesco, Dalida, and Lou van Burg
 In French ("Le Petit Gonzales"): Danyel Gérard, Dalida, Jean Chabrier and Pierre Lalonde
 In Serbo-Croatian ("Mali Gonzales"): Dušan Jakšić (1963)
 In Italian: Johnny Dorelli, Peppino Di Capri, Catullo e gli Enigmisti (Nuova Enigmistica Tascabile, N. 424) (1962)
 In Greek: "Kakosalesi" by Yannis Miliokas (1986)
 In Norwegian: "Fisking i Valdres" (Fishing in Valdres) by Viggo Sandvik (1988)
 In Hungarian: János Koós
 In Korean: 바람둥이 아가씨 by The Key Boys (1964)
 In Estonian: "Viimane vaatus" ("Last act") by Anne Veski (1983)
 In Czech: "Speedy Gonzales" Hana Ulrychová (1971)

See also 
 Crocodile Rock (a song by Elton John with a similar chorus)
 Putin khuilo! (a Russian/Ukrainian football chant, as assumed by Artemy Troitsky, inspired by "Speedy Gonzales" chorus)

References

1961 songs
1962 singles
2007 singles
Pat Boone songs
Kumbia All Starz songs
Songs with lyrics by Buddy Kaye
Songs written by David Hess
Song recordings produced by A. B. Quintanilla
Songs about mice and rats
Songs about comics
Number-one singles in Germany
Looney Tunes songs